The Mount Hope Miners' Church, also known as the Mount Hope Methodist Episcopal Church, is a historic church built in 1868 and located on Mount Hope Road in the Mount Hope section of Rockaway Township in Morris County, New Jersey. It was added to the National Register of Historic Places on August 20, 2012 for its significance in architecture, social history, and religion.

See also
National Register of Historic Places listings in Morris County, New Jersey
List of Methodist churches in the United States

References

External links
 

Rockaway Township, New Jersey
National Register of Historic Places in Morris County, New Jersey
Churches on the National Register of Historic Places in New Jersey
New Jersey Register of Historic Places
Churches in Morris County, New Jersey
Churches completed in 1868
United Methodist churches in New Jersey